Silvia Marciandi (born 13 May 1963) is an Italian freestyle skier. She was born in Aosta. She competed in the 1992 Winter Olympics in Albertville, and at the 1994 Winter Olympics in Lillehammer, in women's moguls.

References

External links 
 

1963 births
Living people
People from Aosta
Italian female freestyle skiers
Olympic freestyle skiers of Italy
Freestyle skiers at the 1992 Winter Olympics
Freestyle skiers at the 1994 Winter Olympics
Sportspeople from Aosta Valley
20th-century Italian people